
Gmina Pęczniew is a rural gmina (administrative district) in Poddębice County, Łódź Voivodeship, in central Poland.

Villages
Gmina Pęczniew contains the villages and settlements of Borki Drużbińskie, Brodnia, Brodnia-Kolonia, Brzeg, Drużbin, Dybów, Ferdynandów, Jadwichna, Kraczynki, Księża Wólka, Księże Młyny, Lubola, Łyszkowice, Osowiec, Pęczniew, Popów, Przywidz, Rudniki, Siedlątków, Wola Pomianowa and Zagórki.

Neighbouring gminas
Gmina Pęczniew is bordered by the gminas of Dobra, Poddębice, Warta and Zadzim.

References
Polish official population figures 2006

Peczniew
Poddębice County